Beeston Hall School is an independent day and boarding preparatory school for boys and girls in the village of Beeston Regis, Norfolk. 
Founded in 1948, Beeston Hall currently accommodates 125 pupils aged 4 – 13 making it the largest boarding preparatory school in East Anglia.

History 
Originally called Beeston Regis Hall, it was once the family home of the Wyndham Ketton-Cremers on the Beeston Regis Estate, part of the much larger Felbrigg Estate, the family seat. In 1940 a German bomb hit the school, causing slight damage. The Hall was leased to Thomas Tapping and his wife Bessie, who opened the private Beeston Hall School in 1948. In 1967 the school became an incorporated trust, and in 1970, following the death of Robert Wyndham Ketton-Cremer, the last squire of Felbrigg, the school acquired the freehold and about 14 acres (5.7 ha) of land. Over the years the school has expanded; it is the biggest employer in the parish. It has also acquired other surrounding land including Beeston Hall Common, which it purchased from the parish of Beeston Regis.

Present school 
The school is currently split into two parts;
 Pre-Prep (ages 4 – 6)
 Prep (ages 7 – 13)

Its pupils take the Common Entrance Examination, going on to a range of public school such as Oundle, Uppingham, Oakham, Harrow, Radley, Eton, Tudor Hall, Norwich High School, Gresham’s, The Leys and Stowe. In 2009 55 percent of Common Entrance papers were graded A or B, rising to 76 percent by 2013; in 2014 figures stood at 92 percent.

There are 4 school houses. Pupils take part in inter-house events including music, quiz, hockey, rugby, swimming, tennis, athletics (sports day) and cross country.

Sports and activities 
Children play sport every afternoon for at least an hour with matches against other schools/clubs mainly on Wednesday and Saturday afternoons. The main sports are Rugby, Hockey and Cricket for the boys and Netball, Hockey, Tennis and Rounders for the girls. In addition, children at Beeston can also take part in Swimming, Tennis, Athletics, Cross-Country, Fencing, Shooting, Sailing and Golf.

The School’s facilities include 25 acres of grass pitches, a full size Astro turf pitch, all-weather (flood lit) Netball and Tennis Courts, an indoor shooting range, a sports hall (large enough for three indoor cricket nets), an outdoor heated 20m Swimming Pool, four Cricket Squares in the summer and outdoor cricket nets.

Boarding 
Beeston Hall has two boarding houses:
 Main House (Years 3-7)
 Deterdings (Years 8 only)

The unique boarding model enables younger pupils to be part of the main boarding community in the heart of the school before moving on to Deterdings in preparation for their senior school.

Religion 
The school is inter-denominational. Worship is led by the school's chaplain, a retired vicar. On Saturdays the whole school attends a service in the twelfth-century Beeston Regis Parish Church whilst Catholics go to the local Catholic church in Cromer on Sunday mornings.

Old Beestonians

Headmasters 
 1948 – 1958: Thomas Tapping
 1960 – 1986: Martin Swindells
 1986 – 1998: John Elder
 1998 – 2009: Innes MacAskill
 2009 – May 2016: Robin Gainher
 May 2016 – July 2016: Tim Morton (acting headmaster)
 September 2016: Fred de Falbe

References

External links 
 School Website
 Profile at the Independent Schools Council website

Preparatory schools in Norfolk
Church of England private schools in the Diocese of Norwich
Boarding schools in Norfolk
1948 establishments in England
Educational institutions established in 1948